The Higher Political Reform Commission of Tunisia was formed on January 17, 2011 by Mohamed Ghannouchi, the Prime Minister of Tunisia.  Its president is Yadh Ben Achour, legal expert and son of the late Grand Mufti of Tunisia Mohamed Fadhel Ben Achour.  The Reform Commission is one of three committees formed by Ghannouchi to reform the government of Tunisia in 2011.

The Commission was charged with overseeing legal and constitutional reform in post-Ben Ali Tunisia., and been merged with the revolutionary  to form the Higher Authority for Realisation of the Objectives of the Revolution, Political Reform and Democratic Transition.

References

Tunisian Revolution
2011 establishments in Tunisia
2011 disestablishments in Tunisia
Reform in Tunisia